A Least squares conformal map (LSCM) is a 2-D representation of a 3-D shape created using the Least Squares Conformal Mapping Method.  By using the map as a guide when creating a new 2-D image, the colors of the 2-D image can be applied to the original 3-D model.

LSCM is used in computer graphics as a method of producing a UV map from a polygonal mesh to a texture map such that the shape of the polygons as mapped to the texture is relatively undistorted.

See also
 Conformal map
 UV mapping

External links
 Least Squares Conformal Maps for Automatic Texture Atlas Generation, ACM SIGGRAPH conference proceedings, 2002

Computer graphics data structures